is a Japanese entrepreneur and author of the business and personal management book Future Notes: The Open Road.

Entrepreneurship 
Watanabe is the founder and CEO of ISFnet Inc., a Tokyo-based integrated IT services company. He has pioneered the adoption of five-star hotel service standards in the IT sector.

Philanthropy 
In 2010, Watanabe established Future Dream Achievement, an NPO aimed at providing education, training, and employment, and advocating equal opportunity employment.

vBibliography 
  (2008), Magazine House, Tokyo,

References 

Year of birth missing (living people)
Living people
Japanese chief executives
Japanese non-fiction writers
Japanese philanthropists